Jonben is an unincorporated community and coal town within the Winding Gulf Coalfield and is located within Raleigh County, West Virginia, United States.

History
The town was founded by John Tolley and Benjamin Meadows. Their Post Office  closed in July 2005.

References 

Unincorporated communities in Raleigh County, West Virginia
Unincorporated communities in West Virginia
Coal towns in West Virginia